Secundian or Secundianus may refer to:

Secundian, Marcellian and Verian (died 250), Christian saints martyred in 250 AD
Donatus, Romulus, Secundian, and 86 Companions (died 304), group of Christians who were martyred c. 304 AD
Secundianus of Singidunum, an Arian bishop of Singidunum deposed at the Council of Aquileia, 381